The Declaration of State Sovereignty of the Russian SFSR was a political act of the Russian Soviet Federative Socialist Republic, then part of the Soviet Union, which marked the beginning of constitutional reform in Russia. The Declaration was adopted by the First Congress of People's Deputies of the Russian SFSR on 12 June 1990. It proclaimed the sovereignty of the Russian SFSR and the intention to establish a democratic constitutional state within a liberalized Soviet Union. The declaration also states the following:

Priority of the constitution and laws of the Russian SFSR over the legislation of the Soviet Union (sovereignty).
Equal legal opportunities for all citizens, political parties, and public organizations (equality before the law).
The principle of separation of legislative, executive and judicial powers;
The need to significantly expand the rights of the autonomous republics, regions, districts, territories of Russia (federalism).

The declaration was signed by then Chairman of the Presidium of the Supreme Soviet of the Russian SFSR, Boris Yeltsin.

The day of the declaration, 12 June, has been celebrated as Russia Day, the national holiday in the Russian Federation, since 1992.

See also
Dissolution of the USSR
Constitution of Russia
Russian Constitution of 1978
Russian constitutional crisis of 1993

Notes

References

External links
Declaration of State Sovereignty of the Russian Soviet Federative Socialist Republic (English) Seventeen Moments in Soviet History Archive, Michigan State University.

Russian Soviet Federative Socialist Republic
Government of Russia
1990 in law
1990 in Russia
1990 in the Soviet Union
Law of Russia
1990 in international relations
1990 documents
1990 in Moscow
June 1990 events in Europe
June 1990 events in Russia